Harry Lamont Snead (February 27, 1890 – July 20, 1979) was an American physician and politician who served in the Virginia House of Delegates.

References

External links 

1890 births
1979 deaths
Members of the Virginia House of Delegates
20th-century American politicians